The Family Legend is an 1810 historical tragedy by the British writer Joanna Baillie. It premiered at the Theatre Royal in Edinburgh on 29 January 1810 and ran for thirteen consecutive nights. The Edinburgh cast included Henry Siddons, his wife Harriet Siddons and Daniel Terry. It's Edinburgh staging was due largely to the lobbying of Walter Scott on its behalf. On 29 May 1815 it debuted in London's West End at the Theatre Royal, Drury Lane with a cast that featured George Bartley as the Earl of Argyle, Alexander Rae as John of Lorne, James William Wallack as Maclean, Samuel Penley as Sir Hubert de Grey, John Powell as Loctorish Mrs Bartley as Helen and Susan Boyce as Rosa. It revolves around the historic rivalry of the Campbells and the Macleans.

References

Bibliography
 Crochunis, Thomas C. Joanna Baillie, Romantic Dramatist: Critical Essays. Routledge, 2004.
 Hawkins, Ann R. Blackwell, Catherine, S. & Bonds, E. Leigh. The Routledge Companion to Romantic Women Writers. Taylor & Francis, 2022.
 Slagle, Judith Bailey. Joanna Baillie, a Literary Life. Fairleigh Dickinson Univ Press, 2002.

1810 plays
West End plays
British plays
Historical plays
Plays set in the 15th century
Plays set in Scotland